USS Lance (AM-257) was an  built for the U.S. Navy during World War II. She was built to clear minefields in offshore waters, and served the Navy in the Atlantic Ocean.

Lance was as laid down 26 October 1942 by American Shipbuilding Co., Cleveland, Ohio; launched 10 April 1943; sponsored by Ens. Josephine D. Cunningham, W-V (S) USNR; commissioned 4 November 1943.

World War II North Atlantic operations
After shakedown along the U.S. East Coast, Lance arrived Trinidad, British West Indies, 17 January 1944 for patrol and escort duty. From January 1944 until March 1945, Lance operated as an escort for convoys, making nine regular runs from Recife, Brazil, to Trinidad. The minesweeper also engaged in ASW training with aircraft operations designed to improve the defensive capability of the Navy.

Lance departed Trinidad 23 March, and steamed toward Miami, Florida, arriving the 28th. She operated as a school ship, out of the Naval Training Center, Miami.

Decommissioning
She was transferred to China, under the Lend-Lease Act on 28 August. She served the Chinese Navy under the name Yung Sheng. She was transferred outright on 7 February 1948, struck from the Naval Vessel Register on 12 March 1948, and decommissioned on 1 July 1972. Fate is unknown.

References

External links
  Dictionary of American Naval Fighting Ships: USS Lance
 NavSource Online: Mine Warfare Vessel Photo Archive: USS Lance

Admirable-class minesweepers
Ships built in Cleveland
1943 ships
World War II minesweepers of the United States
Admirable-class minesweepers of the Republic of China Navy